Sail Rock is a free-standing monolith rock in Russia.

Sail Rock may also refer to:
 Sail Rock (Antarctica)
 Sail Rock (South Shetland Islands)
 Sail Rock (Taiwan), a rock in Pingtung County, Taiwan
 Fatumiala or Sail Rock, an island in Vanuatu
 Sail Rock, an extreme point of the United States
 Sail Rock Island in Bream Bay, an island near North Island in New Zealand

See also
 Sailing stones, rocks that move in long tracks along a smooth valley floor without human or animal intervention